"The Third Man Theme" (also written "3rd Man Theme" and known as "The Harry Lime Theme") is an instrumental written and performed by Anton Karas for the soundtrack to the 1949 film The Third Man.

Background
The Third Man is a 1949 British film noir, directed by Carol Reed. One night after a long day of filming The Third Man on location in Vienna, Reed and cast members Joseph Cotten, Alida Valli and Orson Welles had dinner and retired to a wine cellar. In the bistro, which retained the atmosphere of the pre-war days, they heard the zither music of Anton Karas, a 40-year-old musician who was playing there just for the tips. Reed immediately realized that this was the music he wanted for his film. Karas spoke only German, which no one in Reed's party spoke, but fellow customers translated Reed's offer to the musician that he compose and perform the soundtrack for The Third Man. Karas was reluctant since it meant traveling to England, but he finally accepted. Karas wrote and recorded the 40 minutes of music heard in The Third Man over a six-week period, after the entire film was translated for him at Shepperton Studios.

The composition that became famous as "The Third Man Theme" had long been in Karas's repertoire, but he had not played it in 15 years. "When you play in a café, nobody stops to listen," Karas said. "This tune takes a lot out of your fingers. I prefer playing 'Wien, Wien', the sort of thing one can play all night while eating sausages at the same time."  According to writer and critic Rudi Blesh, the tune is identical to the main theme of "Rags to Burn", a ragtime piano piece credited to Frank X. McFadden and published in Kansas City, Missouri, in 1899.

The prominence of the "Third Man Theme" in the film developed gradually during its editing. Carol Reed initially envisioned Karas' music as being integrated with an orchestral score. The film's editor Oswald Hafenrichter ultimately prevailed in convincing Reed to weave Karas' unaccompanied theme throughout the film. So prominent is "The Third Man Theme" that the image of its performance on the vibrating strings of the zither provides the background for the film's main title sequence. 

The full soundtrack album was ready for release when The Third Man came out, but there was not a lot of interest in it. Instead, labels focused on the catchy main theme and released it as a single. More than half a million copies of "The Third Man Theme" record were sold within weeks of the film's release. The tune was originally released in the UK in 1949, where it was known as "The Harry Lime Theme". Following its release in the US in 1950, "The Third Man Theme" spent 11 weeks at number one on Billboard'''s US Best Sellers in Stores chart, from April 29 to July 8. Its success led to a trend in releasing film theme music as singles. A guitar version by Guy Lombardo also sold strongly. Four other versions charted in the US during 1950. According to Faber and Faber, the different versions of the theme have collectively sold an estimated forty million copies.

The zither-based Anton Karas version excerpted from the film soundtrack was released by Decca in 1949 across Europe with different catalog numbers. It was a 10-inch 78 rpm single with "The Harry Lime theme" on the A side and "The Cafe Mozart Waltz" on the B side. This became the most common version heard by European listeners. 
Decca F.9235 (United Kingdom), Decca NF.9235 (Germany)
Decca M.32760 (Netherlands)
Decca 671 (Italy)

Karas also performed "The Third Man Theme" and other zither music for the 1951–1952 syndicated radio series The Adventures of Harry Lime, a Third Man prequel produced in London. Orson Welles reprised his role as Harry Lime. "Whenever he entered a restaurant in those years, the band would strike up Anton Karas's "Third Man Theme", wrote Welles biographer Joseph McBride.

Other versions

The guitar-based version performed by Guy Lombardo and His Royal Canadians was recorded December 9, 1949 and was released in the US by Decca under catalog number Decca 24839 (1950). It was a 78 rpm 10 inch single that had "The 3rd Man theme" on the A side and "The Cafe Mozart Waltz" on the B side (sand ubsequently released as a 45 rpm 7- inch single). This was the version most familiar to American listeners. It continued in print into the 1980s.
Another guitar-based version was recorded by Chet Atkins on his 1955 album "Stringin' Along with Chet Atkins".
The Swedish-born guitarist Nils Larsson recorded the tune in Stockholm on November 17, 1949 as "Banjo-Lasse" with Thorstein Sjögren's orchestra. It was released on the 78 rpm record HMV X 7567.
Telefunken released a single of the Anton Karas version for the West German market [Telefunken A-10-856] in 1950. It was re-released as a 7 inch 45 rpm format single  [U-45-856] in 1957. 
In 1950 the London Records label (a sub-division of Decca UK) released the Anton Karas version in both a 10 inch 78 rpm single [London 536] and a 7 inch 45 rpm single [London 30005].
 The comedian Victor Borge covered the theme on piano for his 1955 album Caught in the Act. 
Russ Conway recorded a honky tonk piano version of "The Harry Lime theme" with Geoff Love and his Orchestra for Columbia Records in 1958. It was released as a 7 inch 45 rpm single [Columbia 45-DB 4060] with "The Lantern Slide" on the B side. 
Berl Olswanger and the Berl Olswanger Orchestra included their version on the album Berl Olswanger Orchestra with the Olswanger Beat (1964)
Herb Alpert & The Tijuana Brass recorded a Latin-flavored go-go version of the piece arranged for brass instruments on his album !!Going Places!! (1965) for A&M Records.  The song peaked at #47 on Billboard's Hot 100 in 1965.
For their BBC special, It's The Beatles, The Beatles mixed a piece of the tune into an unintentionally instrumental version of "From Me To You" after the microphones had failed and the song had devolved into a tongue-in-cheek vamp. Six years later, they recorded another impromptu version during a jam session in 1969, but neither version has ever appeared on any of their official albums.
The Band played it on Moondog Matinee (1973) [Capitol 93592], an album of song covers. Record World said that "the boys in The Band showcase their instrumental virtuousity on this jaunty yet mellow ditty."
The Shadows recorded a version on their double LP Hits Right Up Your Street (1981) for Polydor Records. The song rose to No. 44 on the UK singles chart in May 1981.
 An unidentified instrumentalist played the song in a bar scene in the 2002 action film XXX.
 Martin Carthy on his album, Waiting for Angels, Topic TSCD527.
 Andy Samberg and Akiva Schaffer's comedy troupe The Lonely Island used a sample of the theme song on the song "Stork Patrol".
 The theme was used for the title sequence of the movie review TV series Ebert Presents: At the Movies.
 George Carlin used "The Harry Lime Theme" to demonstrate "Hawaiian Nose Hummimg" in his 1972 release, "Class Clown".
 Michael "Bully" Herbig used the theme in a key scene in his Western film parody The Shoe of Manitu.

Lyrics

The original lyrics to the song, published under the name "The Zither Melody: song version of The Harry Lime Theme (The Third Man)", were written by Michael Carr and Jack Golden for the London film production (©1950, Chappell & Co., Ltd., London, Sydney & Paris).

Alternate lyrics to the song, published under the name "The Third Man Theme", were written by American author and historian Walter Lord (A Night to Remember, Incredible Victory, etc.) in 1950. Sheet music for the song was sold by Chappell & Co., and it was recorded by Don Cherry and The Victor Young Orchestra on May 5, 1950.

Other utilization
"The Third Man Theme" was used in a 1982 TV mail-order record collection, Aerobic Dancing'' [Parade LP 100A], with Sharon Barbano.

"The Third Man Theme" is informally known in Japan as the "Ebisu Beer Theme," which is still used in Ebisu beer commercials to this day. For this reason, it is also used at Ebisu Station on the JR Yamanote line, Saikyo Line, and Shōnan-Shinjuku Line to inform passengers of departing trains.

See also
List of Billboard number-one singles of 1950

Sources
"The Foreign Film Theme - "The Third Man Theme" 1949". Space Age Pop Music. Retrieved August 25, 2006.
"The Third Man theme" discography. Space Age Pop Music. Retrieved November 21, 2011.

References

External links
 
 Songfacts

1950 singles
Don Cherry songs
Songs written for films
1940s instrumentals
Number-one singles in the United States
Film theme songs
London Records singles
Decca Records singles
1949 songs
Guy Lombardo songs